Saint Melaine (Latin: Melanius or Mellanus; Cornish: Melan; Welsh: Mellon) was a 6th-century Bishop of Rennes in Brittany (now in France).

Traditional history
Melaine grew up at Plaz in Brain, near Redon. He was a pious child, often being punished for spending too long at his prayers. He became a monk and then abbot. He was nominated the successor to Bishop Amand of Rennes. Traditions recounted by Baring-Gould state that on the death of Amand, he was compelled by the local population to become the next Bishop, accepting the role with great reluctance; that he performed many miracles and put an end to heathen practices; and that following his death at La Vilaine, his body was placed on a boat which then returned to Rennes against the current without the assistance of rowers or sails. (However, Louis Duchesne is of opinion that the Amandus reckoned among the bishops of Rennes at the end of the fifth century is the same as Amand of Rodez. He therefore excludes him from his list of authentic bishops of Rennes.)

During his rule, Clovis took over the area and Melaine became his trusted advisor. He opposed immigration from Britain and attended the First Council of Orléans in 511. He died at Plaz in 530 and was buried in the Abbey Church of Notre-Dame en Saint-Mélaine in Rennes.

Veneration
Melaine quickly became revered as a saint, especially after the wooden tower above his grave burnt down and his tomb miraculously survived. He has three feast days: 6 November (death), 6 January (burial) and 11 October (translation).

In Wales, his feast is celebrated locally on 10 October rather than 11 October at St Mellons, in modern-day Cardiff, though there is ambiguity over whether Melaine is the Saint 'Mellonius' said to have been born there.

In Cornwall, he is the patron of the villages of St Mellion and Mullion, where there is a tradition of his visit.

In the English translation of the 1956 edition of the Roman Martyrology, he is listed under 6 January with the citation: At Rennes, in France, St Melanius, Bishop and Confessor, who displayed innumerable virtues, and with his thoughts ever fixed on heaven, passed from the world in glory.

In the 2004 edition of the Roman Martyrology, Melaine is listed under 6 November, with the Latin name Melánii. He is mentioned as follows: 'At Rhedónibus (Rennes) in Brittany, bishop, who passed to God in the place called Plácium on the River Vicenóniam (Vilaine), where with his own hands he built a church and gathered a congregation of monks and servants of God'.

The abbey church of Notre-Dame-en-Saint-Melaine in Rennes was dedicated to him.

References

5th-century births
6th-century deaths
6th-century Christian saints
Bishops of Rennes
Medieval Breton saints
Medieval Cornish saints
Medieval Welsh saints
Welsh Roman Catholic saints
6th-century Breton bishops